Bakary Diakité (born 9 November 1980) is a German-Malian former professional footballer who played as a striker.

References

External links
 
 
 

1980 births
Living people
Footballers from Frankfurt
German people of Malian descent
Malian footballers
German footballers
Association football forwards
VfL Bochum II players
De Graafschap players
Eintracht Frankfurt players
Eintracht Frankfurt II players
OGC Nice players
1. FSV Mainz 05 players
SV Wehen Wiesbaden players
TuS Koblenz players
FSV Frankfurt players
Bakary Diakite
Eredivisie players
Bundesliga players
2. Bundesliga players
Ligue 1 players
Bakary Diakite
Malian expatriate footballers
German expatriate footballers
Malian expatriate sportspeople in Germany
Malian expatriate sportspeople in the Netherlands
Malian expatriate sportspeople in France
Malian expatriate sportspeople in Iran
Expatriate footballers in Germany
Expatriate footballers in the Netherlands
Expatriate footballers in France
Expatriate footballers in Iran
Expatriate footballers in Thailand
Mali international footballers